Nacobbus dorsalis (false root-knot nematode) is a plant pathogenic nematode.

References 

Tylenchida
Plant pathogenic nematodes